The PWS-21 was a Polish passenger aircraft for 4 passengers, built in PWS factory in 1930, that remained a prototype.

Development
The aircraft was developed for a contest for a successor of Junkers F-13 in LOT Polish Airlines. The first design of 1929, named PWS-21, developed by Stanisław Cywiński and Jarosław Naleszkiewicz, was a braced high-wing plane, but it was not realized because LOT demanded bigger passenger cab.

The next design, named PWS-21bis, was a cantilever high-wing plane, similar to Fokker F.VIIa/1m design. The only prototype (markings SP-AEC) first flew in the spring, probably April 1930 in Biała Podlaska. Its counterpart was Lublin R-XI.

The plane appeared not successful. It was too heavy, what resulted in poor speed, ceiling and range, and long take off. In 1931 it was evaluated in LOT airlines, but after a test flight it was returned to the factory. However, at that time there was its development, PWS-24 built, sharing the same lightweight wing, which was ordered by LOT.

Description (PWS-21bis)

High-wing cantilever monoplane of mixed construction, with closed cab and single engine. A fuselage made of a steel frame, covered with canvas. Straight one-piece wooden wing, with elliptical endings, plywood covered, two-spar. Crew of two (pilot and mechanic), in a cabin before the wing, with twin controls. The cabin had a vertical front windshield and doors on both sides. Next and slightly below in a fuselage, under the wing, there was a cabin for 4 passengers, with a door on the left. The cabin had a toilet. The fifth passenger could be taken instead of the mechanic. 9 cylinder radial engine Skoda Wright Whirlwind J-5 (240 hp take-off power, 220 hp nominal power) in the fuselage front, fitted with a Townend ring. Two-blade metal propeller of a fixed pitch. Conventional landing gear, with a rear skid; struts with shock absorbers joined the main gear with wings. Fuel tanks 250 L in central wing section.

Specifications (PWS-21bis)

See also

References

Further reading
Andrzej Glass: "Polskie konstrukcje lotnicze 1893-1939" (Polish aviation constructions 1893-1939), WKiŁ, Warsaw 1977 (Polish language, no ISBN)

External links

Photos and drawings at Ugolok Neba site 

1930s Polish airliners
PWS aircraft
Single-engined tractor aircraft
High-wing aircraft
Aircraft first flown in 1930